Manego may refer to:

Manego, the Japanese term for Mirror Go
Manego (album), an album by Yves Larock